Life Is Strange is an episodic graphic adventure video game developed by Dontnod Entertainment and published by Square Enix's European branch. The first installment of the Life Is Strange series, the game was released in five episodes periodically throughout 2015 for PlayStation 3, PlayStation 4, Windows, Xbox 360, and Xbox One. It was ported to OS X and Linux in 2016 and iOS and Android in 2017–2018. A remastered version of the game was released as part of the Life Is Strange Remastered Collection in February 2022.

The plot focuses on Max Caulfield, an 18-year-old photography student who discovers that she has the ability to rewind time at any moment, leading her every choice to enact the butterfly effect. The player's actions adjust the narrative as it unfolds, and reshape it once allowed to travel back in time. Fetch quests and making environmental changes represent the forms of puzzle solving in addition to using branching choices for conversation.

Development of the game began in April 2013. It was formed with an episodic format in mind, for reasons both financial and creative. The developers conducted field research on the setting by traveling to the Pacific Northwest, and subverted known archetypes to make the characters. Player feedback influenced the adjustments made to the episodes. Story and character arc serve as the central point in the game.

Life Is Strange received generally favorable reviews commending the character development, rewind game mechanic, and tackling of taboo subjects. Criticisms included the slang that was used, poor lip-syncing, and tonal inconsistencies in the story. It was purchased by 3 million unique players as of May 2017. A prequel, Life Is Strange: Before the Storm, was released in August 2017, and a sequel, Life Is Strange 2, in September 2018. An additional installment to the series, Life Is Strange: True Colors, was released in September 2021.

Gameplay

Life Is Strange is a graphic adventure played from a third-person view. The player takes control of Max Caulfield, whose time rewinding ability allows the player to redo almost any action that has been taken. The player can examine and interact with objects, which enables puzzle solving in the form of fetch quests and making changes to the environment. Items that are collected before time travelling are kept in the inventory after the fact.

The player can explore various locations in the fictional setting of Arcadia Bay and communicate with non-playable characters. Dialogue exchanges can be rewound while branching options are used for conversation. Once an event is reset, the details provided earlier are permitted to avail themselves in the future. In some instances, choices in dialogue alter and affect the story through short or long-term consequences. For each one of the choices, something good in the short term could turn out worse later.

Plot
In October 2013, 18-year-old Maxine "Max" Caulfield (Hannah Telle) returns to Arcadia Bay, Oregon to attend Blackwell Academy. During her class with photography teacher Mark Jefferson (Derek Phillips), Max experiences a catastrophic vision of a tornado destroying a lighthouse and approaching the town. Leaving for the restroom to regain her composure, she witnesses classmate Nathan Prescott (Nik Shriner) shoot and kill a girl in a fit of rage. In a sudden effort, she develops the ability to rewind time and saves the girl, revealed to be her childhood friend Chloe Price (Ashly Burch). The two reunite and visit the lighthouse, where Max reveals to Chloe her powers. Strange weather and other anomalies begin to occur throughout Arcadia Bay.

The next day, Max's class is halted when Kate Marsh (Dayeanne Hutton), a fellow student who is being bullied for a viral video depicting her kissing several students at a party, commits suicide by jumping off the roof of the girls' dorm. Max manages to rewind time and reaches the roof, giving her the opportunity to talk Kate down. She ultimately resolves to uncover what happened to Kate and Chloe's missing friend Rachel Amber. Max and Chloe break into the principal's office that night, discovering multiple clues pointing to Nathan. The next morning, they sneak into the motorhome of drug dealer Frank Bowers (Daniel Bonjour), and learn that Rachel was in a relationship with Frank but kept it from Chloe. Max later examines a childhood photo of her and Chloe, but is suddenly transported to the day the picture was taken. She prevents Chloe's father William (Joe Ochman) from dying in a traffic collision, which inadvertently creates an alternative reality where William is alive but Chloe has been paralysed from the neck down as a result of her own accident. Heartbroken, Max uses the photo to undo her actions and return to the present day.

Continuing their investigation, Max and Chloe discover a bunker under a derelict barn owned by the Prescotts, where they find pictures of Kate and Rachel tied up and intoxicated. At a scrapyard, they discover Rachel's remains, much to Chloe's despair. The two head to a school party to confront Nathan, but instead receive a text from him threatening to destroy the evidence. They hurry back to the scrapyard but are ambushed by Jefferson, who anaesthetises Max and kills Chloe with a gunshot to the head. Max wakes up in the bunker, where Jefferson has been drugging and photographing young girls to capture their innocence. Jefferson reveals that he took Nathan under his wing but killed him before abducting Max, and that Nathan gave Rachel an overdose when he tried to mimic Jefferson's work. Jefferson intends to murder Max after he has the photos he wants. Max escapes into a photograph and emerges back at the beginning in Jefferson's class. She alerts David Madsen (Don McManus), Chloe's stepfather and  Blackwell head of security, saving herself and Chloe and leading to the arrest of Jefferson and Nathan.

Max is given the opportunity to go to San Francisco and have one of her photos displayed in an art gallery. She calls Chloe from the event, realising that, for all her effort, the storm has reached Arcadia Bay. Max travels back to the time at which she took the gallery photo, which eventually leads her to sojourn alternative realities as they devolve into a dreamscape nightmare. She reunites with Chloe at the lighthouse, where they confront the possibility that Max brought the storm into existence by saving Chloe from being shot by Nathan earlier in the week. Max must make a choice: rewind time and sacrifice Chloe's life to save Arcadia Bay, or stay in the timeline and spare Chloe but sacrifice Arcadia Bay. If Max chooses the former, she tearfully allows Chloe to be shot. Nathan and Jefferson are arrested, the storm never appears, and Chloe's death is mourned. If Max chooses the latter, the storm hits Arcadia Bay before ceasing. The pair then depart from the now devastated town.

Development

Development of Life Is Strange began in April 2013 with a team of 15, and more people were added when the collaboration with Square Enix began. The episodes were originally aimed to release about 6 weeks apart. Dontnod co-founder Jean-Maxime Moris was originally the game's Creative Director. Dontnod told Square Enix London about Life Is Strange only after they had turned down a pitch for a larger game. Before signing with Square Enix, Life Is Strange was imagined as a full-length video game that Dontnod would self-publish. However, the publisher surmised that it would be more successful as an episodic title. The game was originally codenamed What If but the name was not used because of the film with the same name.

A developer diary was published before release that said most prospective publishers were unwilling to publish a game unless it had a male protagonist. They said most publishers had the same objection to Dontnod's first project, Remember Me, which also had a female protagonist. Dontnod CEO Oskar Guilbert also challenged the idea at the start. The developers said Square Enix was the only publisher with no intention to change this.

Life Is Strange was born from the rewind mechanic idea, which the developer had already experimented on with their last game Remember Me. The lead character Max was created with the ability to rewind time to supplement this mechanism. The episodic format was decided upon by the studio for creative reasons, financial restrictions and marketing purposes, allowing them to tell the story in its preferred slow pace. The Pacific Northwest was picked as the setting for the purpose of conveying a nostalgic and autumnal feel. The development team visited the region, took photographs, looked at local newspapers and used Google Street View to make sure the environment was accurately portrayed. It was decided early on that most of the budget be spent on the writing and voice actors. The original story was written in French by Jean-Luc Cano, and converted into a game script by the co-directors and design team. It was subsequently handed over to Christian Divine and Cano to be fine tuned in English. Story and character development were highlighted over point-and-click puzzles, making choice and consequence integral to how the narrative unfolds. Hannah Telle auditioned for Max Caulfield in July 2014 and was offered the part; Ashly Burch auditioned for both Max and her given role Chloe Price. The recording sessions were done in Los Angeles, California, with the French developer brought in via Skype.

The game has been compared to Remember Me, which holds significant differences but addresses similar themes of memory and identity. Life Is Strange was specified as an analogue look at human identity in contrast to Remember Me, the digital view of the same theme. Running on an improved version of Unreal Engine 3, it makes use of the tools and special effects like lighting and depth of field engineered for Remember Me as well as subsequent advances. Visual effects like post-processes, double exposure and overlapping screen space particles were used as an artistic approach to be displayed while the lead character rewinds time. The textures seen in the game were entirely hand painted, adapted to achieve what art director Michel Koch called "impressionistic rendering". Elements were adjusted based on player feedback, with influences like The Walking Dead, Gone Home and Heavy Rain in mind. Additional sources of inspiration include the visual novel Danganronpa, in terms of balancing gameplay and story, and the novel  The Catcher in the Rye, whose protagonist Holden Caulfield shares a surname with Max, the game's lead. The characters were created using known archetypes, at first to establish an entry point for the player, and then to subvert them. For the sake of serving the realism, the supernatural elements were designed as a metaphor for the characters' inner conflict, and experts were consulted to tackle the subject of teen suicide. The score was composed by Jonathan Morali of the band Syd Matters. Inspired by modern indie folk music, the soundtrack was intended to inform the mood. The music contains a blend of licensed tracks and composed pieces. Featured artists include José González, Mogwai, Breton, Amanda Palmer, Brian Viglione, Bright Eyes, Message to Bears, Local Natives, Syd Matters, Sparklehorse, Angus & Julia Stone, alt-J, Mud Flow and Foals.

Release
Square Enix announced Life Is Strange at Gamescom on 11 August 2014. The episodes were released digitally on PC via Steam, PlayStation 3 and PlayStation 4 via PlayStation Network, and Xbox 360 and Xbox One via Xbox Live between 30 January 2015 and 20 October 2015. Two season pass options were available for reduced prices, one with episode 1-5 and one with episode 2-5. A demo of the first 20 minutes was released simultaneously with episode 1 for consoles and later for PC. In November 2014, the publisher said they were interested in releasing physical copies of the game, but said that at that time they were "100 per cent focused on the digital release". One year later, the retail edition was set to be released for the PC, PS4 and Xbox One in North America on 19 January 2016 and in Europe on 22 January 2016; the limited edition had an artbook, the soundtrack, score, and a director's commentary. The director's commentary was also released as a free DLC. A Japanese dubbed version was released for Microsoft Windows, PlayStation 3 and PlayStation 4 on 3 March 2016. Feral Interactive ported Life Is Strange for OS X, released on 16 June 2016, and Linux, released on 21 July 2016. That same day, the first episode was made indefinitely available for free on Linux, Windows, OS X, PS3, PS4, Xbox 360 and Xbox One. Life Is Strange was included on PlayStation Plus (for America and PAL regions) the month of June 2017. It was released for iOS between 14 December 2017 and 29 March 2018, and launched on Android on 18 July 2018, both ported by Black Wing Foundation.

Reception

Life Is Strange received "generally favorable reviews" according to Metacritic. While some reviewers criticised the games's lip-syncing and use of dated slang, they lauded the character development and time travel component, suggesting that there should be more games like it. Eurogamer said it was "one of the best interactive story games of this generation" and Hardcore Gamer said it was the sleeper hit of 2015. Legendary Entertainment stated it received over 75 Game of the Year awards and listings. In April 2017, Xbox One UK ranked it first in its list of Xbox One games priced under £20. Game director Yoko Taro listed it as one of his favourite PlayStation 4 games.

Kevin VanOrd of GameSpot said Episode 1: Chrysalis is "an involving slice of life that works because its situations eloquently capture a peculiar early-college state of mind", while Game Informers Kimberley Wallace said the game's tackling of "subjects that are usually taboo for video games" was impressive. Destructoids Brett Makedonski said the episode's strongest characteristic was exploration—both "self- and worldly". Mitch Dyer of IGN said the story was ultimately obstructed by its "laughable" script and "worse performances". In response to Episode 2: Out of Time, Polygons Megan Farokhmanesh also said that the emphasis on self-exploration had considerable impact on the enjoyment of the game. Other critics said the ending was an "emotional high point" and that it brought meaning to the choices from both the first and second episodes. Mike Williams said in USgamer that the pacing of Episode 2: Out of Time was "slower and less exciting" than that of episode one. PopMatters' Eric Swain described the episode as generally sincere but containing moments that strained credibility.

Adnan Riaz of Hardcore Gamer said Episode 3: Chaos Theory was a dramatic improvement that presented a "thrilling, poignant, fascinating and ... enticing" narrative whose outcome from past decisions also added a sense of realism. Peter Paras of Game Revolution complimented the character beats, particularly the development of Chloe Price, who he said "really comes into her own as [a] fully-formed character". Though GameSpots Alexa Ray Corriea said that the fetch quests interfered with its emotional quality, the episode built up to a "killer cliffhanger" according to Farokhmanesh. GameZones Matt Liebl said Episode 4: Dark Room was "easily the most emotional episode" and that the mystery of Rachel Amber had done a "tremendous job in keeping us hooked". Tom Hoggins of The Telegraph said the developer's venture into subjects like social division, online bullying, parental conflict and suicide were "bold". Critics said there were tonal problems, caused by the game's "cheap ways" of progressing the plot, such as character inconsistency and superfluous shock value. Critics were more favourable towards the episode's puzzles and relationships. They said the final episode, Polarized, had a "fitting conclusion" to the coming of age story of Max Caulfield and the relationship between the two leads was carried out successfully. One stealth sequence was described as "tedious" and "out-of-place" while other aspects inhabiting the same course of events were favoured. Reviewers were divided on the ending.

Sales
The first episode was ranked fifth among the best selling PlayStation 3 and PlayStation 4 video games of February 2015. Life Is Strange reached one million sales in July 2015, having accumulated over 1.2 million unique players worldwide; the attach rate to units between the complete season and season pass proved to be "extremely strong", divulged Square Enix. The retail edition made seventh place in the top ten UK game sales chart for the week ending 23 January 2016. Life Is Strange was one of the top 100 best-selling games on Steam in 2016. As of May 2017, it was purchased by 3 million unique players.

Awards

Legacy and impact

After Life Is Strange achieved financial and commercial success, Dontnod Entertainment started to become more prominent in the video game industry; publishers pursued the studio for the first time, whereas they previously had to pursue publishers themselves. CEO Oskar Guilbert said that the game saved his company financially after the mediocre sales of Remember Me. The Washington Post noted it as passing the Steven Spielberg test for video game as an art form in their review. Fans speculated and made theories about the plot, as well as predicting part of a possible ending.

In 2016, Square Enix sponsored its own "Everyday Heroes" photography contest, inspired by the game, offering a  scholarship for the winning entry. Square Enix also coordinated with Parent Advocacy Coalition for Educational Rights (PACER) to support an anti-bullying initiative based on themes within the game and donated a total amount of $25,000.

In July 2016, Legendary Digital Studios and Square Enix announced that they would be adapting Life Is Strange as a digital series. At the time of the announcement, they were meeting with potential writers for the series adaptation, which would be set in Arcadia Bay. In 2017, dj2 Entertainment sold the rights to the series to streaming service Hulu. Life Is Strange: Before the Storm, a prequel developed by Deck Nine, launched on 31 August 2017. A free spin-off called The Awesome Adventures of Captain Spirit was announced and released in June 2018. Life Is Strange 2 was released on 27 September 2018, featuring a new location and cast of characters.

A comic book series of the same name, set after the "Sacrifice Arcadia Bay" ending of the game, was released by Titan Comics beginning November 2018. The comic is written by Emma Vieceli, with interior and cover art by Claudia Leonardi and colours by Andrea Izzo. Square Enix also partnered with Titan Comics to produce Life Is Strange: Welcome to Blackwell Academy, a tie-in book about Blackwell Academy and the town of Arcadia Bay, written by Matt Forbeck.

Remastered versions of Life Is Strange and Before the Storm were released on 1 February 2022, as part of Life Is Strange Remastered Collection on PlayStation 4, Xbox One, Microsoft Windows, Google Stadia and at a later date on Nintendo Switch. The remaster includes previously released content with updated visuals and gameplay puzzles, improved character animation, engine and lighting upgrades, and full facial motion capture.

Notes

References

External links

 Official website

 
2015 video games
Adventure games
Android (operating system) games
Bullying in fiction
Fiction about photography
Coming-of-age fiction
Video games about dreams
Episodic video games
Feral Interactive games
High school-themed video games
Interactive movie video games
IOS games
LGBT-related video games
Linux games
MacOS games
Nintendo Switch games
Fiction about murder
Video games about the paranormal
PlayStation 3 games
PlayStation 4 games
PlayStation Network games
Video games about psychic powers
Science fiction video games
Single-player video games
Square Enix games
Fiction about suicide
Video games about time travel
Unreal Engine games
Video games about mental health
Video games adapted into comics
Video games adapted into television shows
Video games developed in France
Video games featuring female protagonists
Video games about parallel universes
Video games scored by Jonathan Morali
Video games set in 2013
Video games set in Oregon
Video games with alternate endings
Video games with time manipulation
Windows games
Xbox 360 games
Xbox 360 Live Arcade games
Xbox One games
BAFTA winners (video games)
The Game Awards winners
Golden Joystick Award winners
Dontnod Entertainment
Game Developers Choice Award winners
Stadia games
Black Tower Studios games